Rio de Moinhos is a freguesia ("civil parish") in the Portuguese municipality of Abrantes, in the district of Santarém.

History
Once called Ribeira dos Moinhos, it arrived at its name from the number of watermills and windmills that line the watercourse, along a  fertile river valley that flows to the Tagus River.

It is unclear when the parish was established, although it is generally assumed that the first inhabitants were fishermen.

Economy
The region is supported by activities that include agriculture, commerce (charcutaria, grocery stores, carpentry shops, civil construction firms and automobile dealerships), services and industry (woodmilling and automobile).

A factory in Tramagal employees many of the people of Rio de Moinhos.

Culture
There are various associations that are tied to social, cultural or economic activities in the parish: the Associação de Moradores de Amoreira, the Associação de Caçadores, the Junta de Agricultores, the Centro de Apoio a Idosos da freguesia de Rio de Moinhos, the Centro Cultural e Desportivo de Amoreira, the Conferência de São Vicente de Paulo, the Sociedade Filarmónica de Educação e Beneficência Riomoinhense (with a history of two hundred years of service), the Casa do Povo de Rio de Moinhos, the folk-singing group "Os Moleiros" (from the same Casa do Povo), the Comissão de melhoramentos da Pucariça and the Associação Juvenil Remoinhos d´Água.

The parish is known for Tigeladas, the Broas de mel, the Ferradura cakes and many of the types of charcutaria (such as Chouriço, Morcela, Farinheira and Moura) that are typical of the dinner services.

Education
In total, approximately 85 students frequent the two levels of public education (pre-school and basic primary school). Pre-school activities are available in Amoreira, Rio de Moinhos and Pucariça (receiving approximately 46 children), the remaining are distributed to the primary school. There are four children's parks in the community.

Sport
Two organizations are responsible for organizing sport in the parish: the Centro de Cultura e Desporto de Amoreira and Casa do Povo de Rio de Moinhos. The population is supported by two football fields: the Ringue de Futebol de Salão and the covered Polidesportivo.

References

Freguesias of Abrantes